Joko Sasongko (born July 4, 1990 in Boyolali, Central Java) is an Indonesian professional footballer who plays as a midfielder for Liga 3 club PSGC Ciamis.

Hounors

Club
Arema Cronus
 Menpora Cup: 2013

Pelita Jaya U-21
 Indonesia Super League U-21 runner-up: 2009-10

References

External links
 
 Joko Sasongko at Liga Indonesia

1990 births
Living people
Javanese people
People from Boyolali Regency
Indonesian footballers
Liga 1 (Indonesia) players
Pelita Jaya FC players
Arema F.C. players
Persisam Putra Samarinda players
Persela Lamongan players
Association football midfielders
Sportspeople from Central Java